Aquilegia grahamii is a species of flowering plant in the buttercup family known by the common name Graham's columbine. It is endemic to Utah in the United States, where it is known only from Uintah County. It occurs in three canyons along the Uinta Mountains. There are an estimated 5,000 to 10,000 individuals.

Description
Aquilegia grahamii is a perennial herb growing 25 to 60 cm tall. Leaves are biternate (= with 3 groups of 3 leaflets), up to 24 long, glandular and sticky. Flowers number 6 or more, nodding (= hanging downward), yellow in the center with red to purple spurs. Blooming occurs in June and July.

Ecology
Aquilegia grahamii occurs next to cliffs of sandstone. It is associated with Calamagrostis scopulorum.

References

External links

grahamii
Flora of Utah
Uintah County, Utah
Plants described in 1993